Rolf Hertzberg (born April 2, 1959) is a former Swedish handball player who competed in the 1984 Summer Olympics.

In 1984 he finished fifth with the Swedish team in the Olympic tournament. He played three matches as goalkeeper.

References

1959 births
Living people
Swedish male handball players
Olympic handball players of Sweden
Handball players at the 1984 Summer Olympics